Ulf Eskil Erik Sundberg (born 29 September 1956) is a Swedish economist, historian and author of books and magazine articles. 

Sundberg was born in Stockholm, graduated Studentexamen at Whitlockska in 1976 and became a Master of Philosophy in 2014. He was created Doctor of Philosophy at Åbo Academy in 2018 on a thesis addressing the loss of the Swedish Empire early in the 18th century. Sundberg is especially skeptical in that book about the inadequate circumstances under which his country’s many outlying fortifications were positioned and maintained, as well as about the planning, construction and remodeling of them by Erik Dahlberg under King Carl XI.

Earlier, he has primarily treated the centuries of warfare in which Sweden and neighboring countries were involved. On a broader field, one of his more noted books is also about the families and relatives of Swedish royalty, including mistresses and extramarital offspring.

Bibliography 
Ulf Sundberg: Svenska freder och stillestånd 1249-1814, Arete Hargshamn 1997  
Ulf Sundberg: Svenska krig 1521-1814, Stockholm 1998  
Ulf Sundberg: Medeltidens svenska krig, Hjalmarson & Högberg, Stockholm 1999  
Ulf Sundberg: Kungliga släktband : kungar, drottningar, frillor och deras barn, Lund 2004  
Ulf Sundberg reviewed by Dick Harrison & : Stockholms blodbad, Historiska media, Lund 2004 ,  
Ulf Sundberg: A short guide to British battleships in World War II, Sundberg & Co, Stockholm 2008  
Ulf Sundberg: Kraftsamling i Gustav III:s krig 1788-1790, Ancile Design, Kristinehamn 2013  
Ulf Sundberg: Utkast till svenska historieverk : Ericus Olai - 2008, Ancile Design, Kristinehamn 2014  
Ulf Sundberg: Swedish defensive fortress warfare in the Great Northern War 1702-1710, Åbo Akademi University Press, Turku 2018  
Ulf Sundberg (preface): Centuries of Selfies Vulkan, Stockholm 2020

References

External links 

Swedish economists
20th-century Swedish historians
1956 births
Living people
Åbo Akademi University alumni
21st-century Swedish historians